The Military Corps of the Sovereign Military Hospitaller Order of Saint John of Jerusalem of Rhodes and of Malta, is a voluntary auxiliary body of the Italian Army for health and humanitarian assistance.

A successor to the armed forces of the Sovereign Military Order of Malta (the Navy of the Order, the Guard of the Grand Master, the Regiment of Malta (infantry), the Regiment of the Falconers (hunters), the Regiment of Cavalry, and the Company of Bombardiers), the Military Corps was founded on 19 January 1877 as the Association of Italian Knights of the Sovereign Military Order of Malta, with the purpose of providing support and health services for the then Royal Italian Army, both in times of war and peace. With circular letter n. 156 of the Official Military Journal of 9 April 1909, by order of King Victor Emmanuel III of Italy, became a special auxiliary body of the Royal Italian Army and adopted the gray-green uniform.

The Military Corps has been involved in a variety of conflicts. In the Italo-Turkish War (1911–1912) to the Corps was given the Regia Marina Hospital ship , which made seven crossings between Naples and Libya, repatriating 1,162 wounded and sick. Mobilized for the First World War (1914–1918), the Military Corps operated with eight relief posts at the front, a field hospital, a territorial hospital in Rome and four hospital trains that transported 448,000 sick over 560,000 km.

See also
 Malteser International
 Corps of Volunteer Nurses of the ACISMOM

References

Sovereign Military Order of Malta
Italian Army
1877 establishments in Italy